True is the debut studio album by Swedish electronic music producer Avicii, released on 13 September 2013 by PRMD Music and Island Records. Avicii said that sonically, the album would move away from his earlier house music sound on previous records by incorporating elements of other genres such as country music. True was preceded by the release of the Aloe Blacc-assisted "Wake Me Up" that featured a rare Marantz Enhanced Digital Stereo audio track and topped several charts around the world, and "You Make Me", which features vocals from Swedish artist Salem Al Fakir.

True debuted at number two on the UK Albums Chart and peaked within the top-ten of at least ten countries; it subsequently re-peaked at number two on the chart in February 2014. On 24 March 2014, Avicii released a remixed version of the album titled True (Avicii by Avicii). A two-disc edition, comprising the standard 10-track edition alongside the remix album featuring a new album cover, was released in June 2014.

Background and composition
Since starting work on a studio album, Avicii stated on multiple occasions that the material on the album will not be a replication of his earlier hits like "Levels" and "Silhouettes" but rather an experimental and more synthetic record. In his own words, he wanted to bring "disruption" to the electronic dance music scene, which he described as "half stuck". Speaking to music magazine Billboard about the new album, Avicii said in response to an earlier conflict at the Ultra Music Festival that he wanted to "bring 15 minutes of something fresh to break [Ultra] up." In context to the listener's reactions to the heavy bluegrass and country music influences, he additionally stated, "We knew people would be provoked". He further explained that True "is about me being true to my sound but also to my own influences and musical preferences. For me it will be successful if it resonates with people – no matter how many. It's what I stand for, so whoever loves it loves what I love. That's what fans are to me." In 2022, Avicii's biography was released four years after his death. Amongst the anecdotes in the work was revealed that Avicii had wanted to collaborate with American icons such as: Paul Simon, Mick Jagger ("who said no"), Van Morrison ("who's representatives were vague in their answer"), while a representative from Interscope Records was unable to get in touch with Slash, Stevie Wonder or Sting regarding potential collaborations. According to Billboard, there was little interest from the musicians: "For these contented men, whose career peaks were at least twenty years behind them, Avicii was at best an obscure Swede with a summer hit."

Promotion
In April 2013, Avicii released a 60-minute promotional mix of new album material on the online audio distribution platform SoundCloud. The mix featured several unreleased tracks from the album like "Wake Me Up" and songs featuring Dan Reynolds and Mac Davis, and has been played over three million times. According to Billboard, the album was due for release on 17 September 2013.

Ultra Music Festival

Avicii performed at the 2013 Ultra Music Festival on 22 March 2013, revealing nearly forty minutes of new album material from True, to which he received a mixed to negative response from critics, fans and media alike. The new material, which incorporated bluegrass and country music elements, and included live performances from Aloe Blacc, backed by a banjo and kazoo, saw a negative response at the festival, whose attendees criticized the DJ for bringing the experimental material to a high-profile electronic dance music festival. Some fans and following musicians also took to social media sites like Twitter to bash the performance. Dubstep/electro house musician Jake Stanczak, better known as Kill the Noise, tweeted: "What are the similarities and differences between Avicii and Al Walser? Discuss." Producer Tommie Sunshine tweeted: "I just listened to @Avicii's @ultramusic Festival Main Stage set; did he jump the #EDM shark?"

However, fans and high-profile musicians were quick to support Avicii and praise his performance at the Ultra Music Festival. Russian producer Zedd said in response to a negative comment about the performance, "I only heard a couple of those country-sounding tracks and I really liked them!" Avicii's manager Ash Pournouri stated on Twitter: "So proud of @Avicii set at @ultramusic. Everyone will understand in a week. Stay calm and keep hyping the album."

On 26 March, Avicii went on Facebook to respond to the negative reaction to the Ultra Music Festival performance. He stated in an extended response, "we wanted to make a statement, and theres really no better place to make one than UMF mainstage. People will soon see what it's all about. [...] My music is open to anyone who wants to listen to it and I will always stay true to my sound. Love you all who listen with open hearts and open minds."

True Reveal
On 13 August 2013, Avicii premiered his #TrueReveal project. Avicii's management set up an experiment, featuring a glass cube, of which was surrounded by large speakers, and in the cube contained the album artwork for True. Twitter users could tweet a true meaning about themselves using the hash-tag #TrueReveal, and the more users who did this, the more volume of Avicii's second single from the album was directed at the glass cube, until it would break, releasing the album artwork. The experiment ended on 14 August 2013, at 3:29 pm EST. The experiment achieved over 100,000 tweets at 3:13, but the glass still did not break. A crane was called in and a worker threw the hook of the crane into the glass, breaking it, and revealing the album cover.

Later on, the second part of True Reveal was announced. "Track Ambassador" is a project that aims to make 15-second teasers on Instagram to each song on the album. The most voted teasers will be selected as the official ones and the creators will be involved in the making of the official full music video. The winners were revealed on 17 September 2013.

True (Avicii by Avicii)
On 17 February 2014, manager Ash Pournouri, confirmed through his Facebook, Twitter and Instagram pages that Avicii was due to release a remix edition of True, containing a remake of all the tracks in True remixed by Avicii himself, however, "Heart Upon My Sleeve", "Canyons", "Edom", "Long Road to Hell", "All You Need Is Love," and "Always on the Run" were not remixed. On 20 February, it was confirmed that the remix edition was due to be released on 24 March 2014.

Singles
"Wake Me Up" was released as the lead single from True on 17 June 2013. The song was first premiered on Pete Tong's show on BBC Radio 1 on 14 June 2013. The song, which features vocals from Aloe Blacc, has so far charted on 20 national singles charts, peaking at number one in ten countries, including the Australian ARIA Charts and the Swedish Sverigetopplistan charts. The song has also peaked at number four on the Billboard Hot 100. The song features a Marantz enhanced digital audio track.

"You Make Me", featuring vocals from Swedish soul/pop singer Salem Al Fakir was revealed as the album's second single on 16 August 2013, when it received its worldwide radio premiere on Pete Tong's BBC Radio 1 dance music show. The single was released in Australia and New Zealand on 30 August 2013 and was scheduled in the United Kingdom for 15 September 2013, a day before the album's release in that region. The song, so far, has charted within the top 40 in several countries including the Netherlands, Germany, Australia and Ireland. Notably, the single has peaked at number one in Avicii's home country of Sweden, the top five in the United Kingdom, and at number 44 on the Canadian Hot 100.

"Hey Brother" was serviced to radio on 9 October 2013 as the album's third single in Australia, and on 1 October 2013 in Denmark. On 28 October 2013, it was released as the album's third single in Germany, Switzerland and Austria. It was released to US Triple A radio on 18 November 2013.

"Addicted to You" impacted Australian radio on 27 November 2013 as the album's fourth single. "Addicted to You" had a lyric video release on Avicii's VEVO page on 24 January 2014.

"Lay Me Down" was released as the fifth single from True; it was released to Australian radio on 21 April 2014.

Critical reception 

True received generally positive reviews. At Metacritic, which assigns a rating out of 100 to reviews from mainstream critics, the album received an average score of 69, based on seven reviews, which indicates "generally positive reviews".

Philip Sherburne from Spin magazine gave the album a positive review. In his review of True, Sherburne said "Avicii inhabits his newfound country-pop shtick so naturally that you may wonder whether he somehow internalized Ralph Lauren's aesthetic, or whether 'going country' was part of the business plan all along... It may be a sprawling hodge-podge, but all this works more often than you'd expect." Rolling Stones Caryn Ganz also gave the album a positive review, complementing the diversity of the guest musicians. In her review, Ganz said "Dan Tyminski of Union Station sings the grand Appalachian stomper "Hey Brother," and Imagine Dragons penned "Heart Upon My Sleeve." True saves room for two funky disco jams featuring banging diva vocals from Audra Mae and Adam Lambert. All of this proves that Avicii's new sound is much more than a page from Moby's Play book. PopMatterss Francesca D'Arcy-Orga agreed, saying that "Avicii takes his listeners on a journey with True... it is an album that takes one type of music and moulds it into something completely different, allowing Avicii to cement himself as one of the best DJs in the world.

However, David Jeffires of AllMusic gave the album a mixed-positive review, saying "Country music and bluegrass keep winding their way into the album, and while it rarely smacks of a gimmick, these rustic numbers often evolve into EDM around their drum machine-introducing choruses [...] In the end, it's an admirable and interesting effort where the highs offset the lows, but those with molly in hand and dancing shoes on feet should just cool their jets and get ready to sit a spell." Blue Sullivan's review for Slant Magazine only awarded the album 0.5 out of five stars, saying that "Fans will likely write this off as churlish hatred of pop EDM, but there are other artists that are more than capable of arousing genuine dance-floor thrills [...] Moreover, these artists' best material convincingly conveys something Avicii's work rarely does: a bone-deep love of this music and a palpable desire to create art their beloved EDM ancestors would be proud of."

True ranked 7th on the list The 40 Greatest Dance Albums of the Decade: Staff List by Billboard in 2019. It was ranked at number 45 on Rolling Stones list of the 50 best albums of 2013.

Track listing

Notes
  signifies co-producer

Remix album / CD 2 of two-disc edition

Personnel
Vocals
 Adam Lambert (track 8)
 Aloe Blacc (tracks 1 and 6)
 Audra Mae (tracks 4, 7 and 11; "Long Road to Hell")
 Blondfire (track 6)
 Dan Tyminski (track 3)
 Linnea Henriksson (track 9)
 Karen Marie Ørsted (track 5)
 Noonie Bao (track 11 (Amazon Europe) /12 (Japanese Edition); "Always on the Run")
 Ruth-Anne (track 11 (Japanese Edition) /12 (Spotify); "All You Need Is Love")
 Salem Al Fakir (track 2 and 3; "Hey Brother (Avicii by Avicii)")
 Sterling Fox (track 7)

Instruments
 Mac Davis – guitar (tracks 4)
 Peter Dyer – keyboards (tracks 1, 6, 7), talkbox (7)
 Mike Einziger – guitar (tracks 1, 6)
 Nile Rodgers – guitar (tracks 8)

Production
 Tim Bergling – producer, mixer
 Stuart Hawkes – mastering
 Arash Pournouri – co-producer

Charts

Weekly charts

True

True (Avicii by Avicii)

Year-end charts

True

True (Avicii by Avicii)

Certifications

Release history

References

2013 debut albums
Albums produced by Nile Rodgers
Avicii albums
Island Records albums
Country albums by Swedish artists
Bluegrass albums
Soul albums by Swedish artists